Stephen Glenn Martin (born August 14, 1945) is an American actor, comedian, writer, producer, and musician. He has won five Grammy Awards, a Primetime Emmy Award, and was awarded an Honorary Academy Award in 2013. Additionally, he was nominated for two Tony Awards for his musical Bright Star in 2016. Among many honors, he received the Mark Twain Prize for American Humor in 2005, the Kennedy Center Honors in 2007, and an AFI Life Achievement Award in 2015. In 2004, Comedy Central ranked Martin at sixth place in a list of the 100 greatest stand-up comics. The Guardian named him one of the best actors never to have received an Academy Award nomination.

Martin came to public notice in the 1960s as a writer for The Smothers Brothers Comedy Hour, for which he won a Primetime Emmy Award in 1969, and later as a frequent host on Saturday Night Live. In the 1970s, Martin performed his offbeat, absurdist comedy routines before sold-out theaters on national tours. Since the 1980s, having retired from stand-up comedy, Martin has become a successful actor, starring in such films as The Jerk (1979), Dead Men Don't Wear Plaid (1982), The Man with Two Brains (1983), All of Me (1984), ¡Three Amigos! (1986), Planes, Trains and Automobiles (1987), Dirty Rotten Scoundrels (1988), L.A. Story (1991), Bowfinger (1999) and Looney Tunes: Back in Action (2003). He played family patriarchs in Parenthood (1989), the Father of the Bride films (1991–1995), and the Cheaper by the Dozen films (2003–2005).

Since 2015, Martin has embarked on several national comedy tours with fellow comedian Martin Short. In 2018, they released their Netflix special An Evening You Will Forget for the Rest of Your Life for which they received three Primetime Emmy Award nominations. In 2021, he co-created and starred in his first television show, the Hulu comedy series Only Murders in the Building alongside Short and Selena Gomez where he earned three Primetime Emmy Award nominations, two Screen Actors Guild Award nominations, a Golden Globe Award nomination, and a 2021 Peabody Award nomination. In 2022, Martin and Short co-hosted Saturday Night Live together with Gomez making an appearance. 

Martin is also known for writing the book to the musical Bright Star (2016) and to the comedy Meteor Shower (2017), both of which premiered on Broadway; he co-wrote the music to the former. He has played banjo since an early age and has included music in his comedy routines from the beginning of his professional career. Since the 2000s he has increasingly dedicated his career to music, acting less and spending much of his professional life playing banjo, recording, and touring. He has performed with various bluegrass acts, including Earl Scruggs, with whom he won a Grammy for Best Country Instrumental Performance in 2002. His first solo music album, The Crow: New Songs for the 5-String Banjo (2009) received the Grammy Award for Best Bluegrass Album.

Early life and education

Martin was born on August 14, 1945 in Waco, Texas, the son of Mary Lee (née Stewart; 1913–2002) and Glenn Vernon Martin (1914–1997), a real estate salesman and aspiring actor. He has an older sister, Melinda.

Martin is of English, Scottish, Welsh, Scots-Irish, German, and French descent, and was raised in Inglewood, California with his sister, and then later in Garden Grove, California, in a Baptist family. Martin was a cheerleader at Garden Grove High School. One of his earliest memories is of seeing his father, as an extra, serving drinks onstage at the Call Board Theatre on Melrose Place. During World War II, in the United Kingdom, Martin's father had appeared in a production of Our Town with Raymond Massey. Expressing his affection through gifts, like cars and bikes, Martin's father was stern, and not emotionally open to his son. He was proud but critical, with Martin later recalling that in his teens his feelings for his father were mostly of hatred.

Martin's first job was at Disneyland, selling guidebooks on weekends and full-time during his school's summer break. That lasted for three years (1955–1958). During his free time, he frequented the Main Street Magic shop, where tricks were demonstrated to patrons. While working at Disneyland, he was captured in the background of the home movie that was made into the short-subject film Disneyland Dream, incidentally becoming his first film appearance. By 1960, he had mastered several magic tricks and illusions and took a paying job at the Magic shop in Fantasyland in August. There he perfected his talents for magic, juggling, and creating balloon animals in the manner of mentor Wally Boag, frequently performing for tips.

In his authorized biography, close friend Morris Walker suggests that Martin could "be described most accurately as an agnostic ... he rarely went to church and was never involved in organized religion of his own volition". In his early 20s, Martin dated Melissa Trumbo, daughter of novelist and screenwriter Dalton Trumbo.

After high school, Martin attended Santa Ana College, taking classes in drama and English poetry. In his free time, he teamed up with friend and Garden Grove High School classmate Kathy Westmoreland to participate in comedies and other productions at the Bird Cage Theatre. He joined a comedy troupe at Knott's Berry Farm. Later, he met budding actress Stormie Sherk, and they developed comedy routines and became romantically involved. Sherk's influence caused Martin to apply to the California State University, Long Beach, for enrollment with a major in philosophy. Sherk enrolled at UCLA, about an hour's drive north, and the distance eventually caused them to lead separate lives.

Inspired by his philosophy classes, Martin considered becoming a professor instead of an actor-comedian. His time at college changed his life.  Martin recalls reading a treatise on comedy that led him to think:  Martin periodically spoofed his philosophy studies in his 1970s stand-up act, comparing philosophy with studying geology. 

In 1967, Martin transferred to UCLA and switched his major to theater. While attending college, he appeared in an episode of The Dating Game, winning a date with Deana Martin. Martin began working local clubs at night, to mixed notices, and at twenty-one, he dropped out of college.

Career

Stand-up comedy

Late night 
In 1967, his former girlfriend Nina Goldblatt, a dancer on The Smothers Brothers Comedy Hour, helped Martin land a writing job with the show by submitting his work to head writer Mason Williams. Williams initially paid Martin out of his own pocket. Along with the other writers for the show, Martin won an Emmy Award in 1969 at the age of twenty-three. He wrote for The Glen Campbell Goodtime Hour and The Sonny & Cher Comedy Hour. Martin's first television appearance was on The Smothers Brothers Comedy Hour in 1968. He says:  During these years his roommates included Gary Mule Deer and Michael Johnson. Gary Mule Deer supplied the first joke Martin submitted to Tommy Smothers for use on the Smothers Brothers Comedy Hour show. Martin opened for groups such as The Nitty Gritty Dirt Band (who returned the favor by appearing in his 1980 television special All Commercials), The Carpenters, and Toto. He appeared at The Boarding House, among other venues. He continued to write, earning an Emmy nomination for his work on Van Dyke and Company in 1976.
In the mid-1970s, Martin made frequent appearances as a stand-up comedian on The Tonight Show Starring Johnny Carson, and on The Gong Show, HBO's On Location, The Muppet Show, and NBC's Saturday Night Live (SNL). SNL audience jumped by a million viewers when he made guest appearances, and he was one of the show's most successful hosts. Martin has appeared on twenty-seven Saturday Night Live shows and guest-hosted sixteen times, second only to Alec Baldwin, who has hosted seventeen times . On the show, Martin popularized the air quotes gesture. While on the show, Martin grew close to several cast members, including Gilda Radner. On the night she died of ovarian cancer, a visibly shaken Martin hosted SNL and featured footage of himself and Radner together in a 1978 sketch.

Comedy albums 

In the 1970s, his television appearances led to the release of comedy albums that went platinum. The track "Excuse Me" on his first album, Let's Get Small (1977), helped establish a national catch phrase. His next album, A Wild and Crazy Guy (1978), was an even bigger success, reaching the No. 2 spot on the U.S. sales chart, selling over a million copies. "Just a wild and crazy guy" became another of Martin's known catchphrases. The album featured a character based on a series of Saturday Night Live sketches in which Martin and Dan Aykroyd played the Festrunk Brothers; Yortuk and Georgi were bumbling Czechoslovak would-be playboys. The album ends with the song "King Tut", sung and written by Martin and backed by the "Toot Uncommons", members of the Nitty Gritty Dirt Band. It was later released as a single, reaching No. 17 on the U.S. charts in 1978 and selling over a million copies. The song came out during the King Tut craze that accompanied the popular traveling exhibit of the Egyptian king's tomb artifacts. Both albums won Grammys for Best Comedy Recording in 1977 and 1978, respectively. Martin performed "King Tut" on April 22, 1978, SNL program.

Decades later, in 2012, The A.V. Club described Martin's unique style and its effect on audiences:

On his comedy albums, Martin's stand-up is self-referential and sometimes self-mocking. It mixes philosophical riffs with sudden spurts of "happy feet", banjo playing with balloon depictions of concepts like venereal disease, and the "controversial" kitten juggling (he is a master juggler; the "kittens" were stuffed animals). His style is off-kilter and ironic and sometimes pokes fun at stand-up comedy traditions, such as Martin opening his act (from A Wild and Crazy Guy) by saying:  Or: "Hello, I'm Steve Martin, and I'll be out here in a minute." In one comedy routine, used on the Comedy Is Not Pretty! album, Martin claimed that his real name was "Gern Blanston". The riff took on a life of its own. There is a Gern Blanston website, and for a time a rock band took the moniker as its name.

Martin's show soon required full-sized stadiums for the audiences he was drawing. Concerned about his visibility in venues on such a scale, Martin began to wear a distinctive three-piece white suit that became a trademark for his act. Martin stopped doing stand-up comedy in 1981 to concentrate on movies and did not return for thirty-five years. About this decision, he states "My act was conceptual. Once the concept was stated, and everybody understood it, it was done. ... It was about coming to the end of the road. There was no way to live on in that persona. I had to take that fabulous luck of not being remembered as that, exclusively. You know, I didn't announce that I was stopping. I just stopped."

Return to standup 
In 2016, Martin made a low-key comeback to live comedy, opening for Jerry Seinfeld. He performed a ten-minute stand-up routine before turning the stage over to Seinfeld. Also in 2016 he staged a national tour with Martin Short and the Steep Canyon Rangers, which yielded a 2018 Netflix comedy special, Steve Martin and Martin Short: An Evening You Will Forget for the Rest of Your Life. The special received four Primetime Emmy Award nominations with Martin receiving two nominations for Outstanding Writing for a Variety Special and Outstanding Music and Lyrics for The Buddy Song.

Acting career

1970s 
By the end of the 1970s, Martin had acquired the kind of following normally reserved for rock stars, with his tour appearances typically occurring at sold-out arenas filled with tens of thousands of screaming fans. But unknown to his audience, stand-up comedy was "just an accident" for him; his real goal was to get into film.

Martin had a small role in the 1972 film Another Nice Mess. In 1974, he starred in the Canadian travelogue production The Funnier Side Of Eastern Canada, created to promote tourism in Montreal and Toronto, which also included standup segments filmed at the Ice House in Pasadena, California. His first substantial film appearance was in a short titled The Absent-Minded Waiter (1977). The seven-minute-long film, also featuring Buck Henry and Teri Garr, was written by and starred Martin. The film was nominated for an Academy Award as Best Short Film, Live Action. He made his first substantial feature film appearance in the musical Sgt. Pepper's Lonely Hearts Club Band, where he sang The Beatles' "Maxwell's Silver Hammer". In 1979, Martin starred in the comedy film The Jerk, directed by Carl Reiner, and written by Martin, Michael Elias, and Carl Gottlieb. The film was a huge success, grossing over $100 million on a budget of approximately $4 million.

Stanley Kubrick met with him to discuss the possibility of Martin starring in a screwball comedy version of Traumnovelle (Kubrick later changed his approach to the material, the result of which was 1999's Eyes Wide Shut). Martin was executive producer for Domestic Life, a prime-time television series starring friend Martin Mull, and a late-night series called Twilight Theater. It emboldened Martin to try his hand at his first serious film, Pennies from Heaven (1981), based on the 1978 BBC serial by Dennis Potter. He was anxious to perform in the movie because of his desire to avoid being typecast. To prepare for that film, Martin took acting lessons from director Herbert Ross and spent months learning how to tap dance. The film was a financial failure; Martin's comment at the time was "I don't know what to blame, other than it's me and not a comedy."

1980s 
Martin was in three more Reiner-directed comedies after The Jerk: Dead Men Don't Wear Plaid in 1982, The Man with Two Brains in 1983 and All of Me in 1984, his most critically acclaimed performance up to that point. Martin was by now requesting almost $3 million per film, but Plaid and Two Brains both failed at the box office like Pennies, endangering his young career. In 1986, Martin joined fellow Saturday Night Live veterans Martin Short and Chevy Chase in ¡Three Amigos!, directed by John Landis, and written by Martin, Lorne Michaels, and singer-songwriter Randy Newman. It was originally entitled The Three Caballeros and Martin was to be teamed with Dan Aykroyd and John Belushi. In 1986, Martin was in the movie musical film version of the hit Off-Broadway play Little Shop of Horrors (based on a famous B-movie), playing the sadistic dentist, Orin Scrivello. The film was the first of three films teaming Martin with Rick Moranis. In 1987, Martin joined comedian John Candy in the John Hughes movie Planes, Trains and Automobiles. That same year, Roxanne, the film adaptation of Cyrano de Bergerac which Martin co-wrote, won him a Writers Guild of America Award. It also garnered recognition from Hollywood and the public that he was more than a comedian. In 1988, he performed in the Frank Oz film Dirty Rotten Scoundrels, a remake of Bedtime Story, alongside Michael Caine. Also in 1988, he appeared at the Mitzi E. Newhouse Theater at Lincoln Center in a revival of Waiting for Godot directed by Mike Nichols. He played Vladimir, with Robin Williams as Estragon and Bill Irwin as Lucky. Martin starred in the Ron Howard film Parenthood with Rick Moranis in 1989.

1990s 
He later re-teamed with Moranis in the Mafia comedy My Blue Heaven (1990). In 1991, Martin starred in and wrote L.A. Story, a romantic comedy, in which the female lead was played by his then-wife Victoria Tennant. Martin also appeared in Lawrence Kasdan's Grand Canyon, in which he played the tightly wound Hollywood film producer, Davis, who was recovering from a traumatic robbery that left him injured, which was a more serious role for him. Martin also starred in a remake of the comedy Father of the Bride in 1991 (followed by a sequel in 1995) and in the 1992 comedy Housesitter, with Goldie Hawn and Dana Delany. In 1994, he starred in A Simple Twist of Fate; a film adaptation of Silas Marner.

In David Mamet's 1997 thriller The Spanish Prisoner, Martin played a darker role as a wealthy stranger who takes a suspicious interest in the work of a young businessman (Campbell Scott). He went on to star with Eddie Murphy in the 1999 comedy Bowfinger, which Martin also wrote.

In 1998, Martin guest starred with U2 in the 200th episode of The Simpsons titled "Trash of the Titans", providing the voice for sanitation commissioner Ray Patterson. In 1999, Martin and Hawn starred in a remake of the 1970 Neil Simon comedy, The Out-of-Towners.

2000s 
By 2003, Martin ranked fourth on the box office stars list, after starring in Bringing Down The House (2003) and Cheaper by the Dozen (2003), each of which earned over $130 million at U.S. theaters. That same year, he also played the villainous Mr. Chairman in the animation/live action blend, Looney Tunes: Back in Action. In 2005, Martin wrote and starred in Shopgirl, based on his own novella (2000), and starred in Cheaper by the Dozen 2. In 2006, he starred in the box office hit The Pink Panther, as the bumbling Inspector Clouseau. He reprised the role in 2009's The Pink Panther 2. When combined, the two films grossed over $230 million at the box office.

In the comedy Baby Mama (2008), starring Tina Fey and Amy Poehler, Martin played the founder of a health food company. Martin also appeared as a guest star in 30 Rock as Gavin Volure in the episode Gavin Volure. He was nominated for an Outstanding Guest Actor in a Comedy Series. The following year he starred in Nancy Meyers' romantic comedy It's Complicated (2009), opposite Meryl Streep and Alec Baldwin. In 2009, an article in The Guardian listed Martin as one of the best actors never to receive an Oscar nomination.

2010s 

During the 2010s Martin sparsely appeared in film and television. In 2011 he appeared with Jack Black, Owen Wilson, and JoBeth Williams in the birdwatching comedy The Big Year directed by David Frankel. The film was criticized for its lightweight story and was a box office bomb. After a three-year hiatus, Martin returned in 2015 when he voiced a role in the DreamWorks animated film Home alongside Jim Parsons and Rihanna. The film received mixed critical reception but was a financial success. In 2016, he played a supporting role in Ang Lee's war drama Billy Lynn's Long Halftime Walk. He also appeared as himself in Jerry Seinfeld's Netflix series Comedians in Cars Getting Coffee in 2016. He also appeared in the taped version of Oh, Hello on Broadway (2017) as the guest. He also starred in the Netflix comedy special An Evening You Will Forget for the Rest of Your Life with Martin Short in 2018.

2020s 
In February 2020, Martin opened the 92nd Academy Awards alongside Chris Rock with comedy material. They were not previously announced as that year's hosts, and joked after their opening monologue, "Well we've had a great time not hosting tonight". In 2020, Martin reprised his role as George Banks in the short Father of the Bride, Part 3(ish). Martin stars in and is an executive producer of Only Murders in the Building, a Hulu comedy series alongside Martin Short and Selena Gomez, which he created alongside John Hoffman. In August 2022, Martin revealed that the series will likely be his final role, as he does not intend to seek out roles or cameos for other shows or films once the series ends.

Writing

Books
Martin's first book was Cruel Shoes, a collection of comedic short stories and essays.  It was published in 1979 by G. P. Putnam's Sons after a limited release of a truncated version in 1977.

Throughout the 1990s, Martin wrote various pieces for The New Yorker. In 2002, he adapted the Carl Sternheim play The Underpants, which ran Off Broadway at Classic Stage Company, and in 2008 co-wrote and produced Traitor, starring Don Cheadle. He has also written the novellas Shopgirl (2000) and The Pleasure of My Company (2003), both more wry in tone than raucous. A story of a 28-year-old woman behind the glove counter at the Saks Fifth Avenue department store in Beverly Hills, Shopgirl was made into a film starring Martin and Claire Danes. The film premiered at the Toronto International Film Festival in September 2005 and was featured at the Chicago International Film Festival and the Austin Film Festival before going into limited release in the US. In 2007, he published a memoir, Born Standing Up, which Time magazine named as one of the Top 10 Nonfiction Books of 2007, ranking it at  6, and praising it as "a funny, moving, surprisingly frank memoir." In 2010, he published the novel An Object of Beauty.

Beginning in 2019, Martin has collaborated with cartoonist Harry Bliss as a writer for the syndicated single-panel comic Bliss. Together, they published the cartoon collection A Wealth of Pigeons. In 2022, they collaborated again for Martin's illustrated autobiography, Number One is Walking.

Plays 

In 1993, Martin wrote his first full-length play, Picasso at the Lapin Agile. The first reading of the play took place in Beverly Hills, California at his home, with Tom Hanks reading the role of Pablo Picasso and Chris Sarandon reading the role of Albert Einstein. Following this, the play opened at the Steppenwolf Theatre Company in Chicago, and played from October 1993 to May 1994, then went on to run successfully in Los Angeles, New York City, and several other US cities. In 2009, the school board in La Grande, Oregon, refused to allow the play to be performed after several parents complained about the content. In an open letter in the local Observer newspaper, Martin wrote:

Broadway 
Inspired by Love has Come for You, Martin and Edie Brickell collaborated on his first musical, Bright Star. It is set in the Blue Ridge Mountains of North Carolina in 1945–46, with flashbacks to 1923. The musical debuted on Broadway on March 24, 2016. Charles Isherwood of The New York Times praised its score by Martin and Brickell writing, "The shining achievement of the musical is its winsome country and bluegrass score, with music by Mr. Martin and Ms. Brickell, and lyrics by Ms. Brickell...the songs — yearning ballads and square-dance romps rich with fiddle, piano, and banjo, beautifully played by a nine-person band — provide a buoyancy that keeps the momentum from stalling." The musical went on to receive five Tony Award nominations including Best Musical. Martin himself received Tony nominations for Best Book of a Musical and Best Original Score and received the Drama Desk Award for Outstanding Music and the Outstanding Critics Circle Award for Best New Score. He also received a Grammy Award for Best Musical Theater Album.

Martin's next work as a playwright was the comic play Meteor Shower which opened at San Diego's Old Globe Theatre in August 2016, and went on to Connecticut's Long Wharf Theatre later the same year. The play opened on Broadway at the Booth Theater on November 29, 2017. The cast features Amy Schumer, Laura Benanti, Jeremy Shamos and Keegan-Michael Key, with direction by Jerry Zaks. Critic Allison Adaot of Entertainment Weekly wrote, "Meteor Shower is a very funny play. Keening-like-a-howler-monkey funny. Design-a-new-cry-laughing-emoji funny...In the confident hands of writer and comedy maestro Steve Martin, the premise is polished to sparkling."

Hosting
Martin hosted the Academy Awards solo in 2001 and 2003, and with Alec Baldwin in 2010. In 2005, Martin co-hosted Disneyland: The First 50 Magical Years, marking the park's anniversary. Disney continued to run the show until March 2009, which now plays in the lobby of Great Moments with Mr. Lincoln.

A fan of Monty Python, in 1989 Martin hosted the television special, Parrot Sketch Not Included – 20 Years of Monty Python.

Music career

Banjo music 

Martin first picked up the banjo when he was around 17 years of age. Martin has stated in several interviews and in his memoir, Born Standing Up, that he used to take 33 rpm bluegrass records and slow them down to 16 rpm and tune his banjo down, so the notes would sound the same. Martin was able to pick out each note and perfect his playing. Martin learned how to play the banjo with help from John McEuen, who later joined the Nitty Gritty Dirt Band. McEuen's brother later managed Martin as well as the Nitty Gritty Dirt Band. Martin did his stand-up routine opening for the band in the early 1970s. He had the band play on his hit song "King Tut", being credited as "The Toot Uncommons" (as in Tutankhamun). The banjo was a staple of Martin's 1970s stand-up career, and he periodically poked fun at his love for the instrument. On the Comedy Is Not Pretty! album, he included an all-instrumental jam, titled "Drop Thumb Medley", and played the track on his 1979 concert tour. His final comedy album, The Steve Martin Brothers (1981), featured one side of Martin's typical stand-up material, with the other side featuring live performances of Steve playing banjo with a bluegrass band.

In 2001, he played banjo on Earl Scruggs's remake of "Foggy Mountain Breakdown". The recording was the winner of the Best Country Instrumental Performance category at the Grammy Awards of 2002. In 2008, Martin appeared with the band, In the Minds of the Living, during a show in Myrtle Beach, South Carolina. In 2009, Martin released his first all-music album, The Crow: New Songs for the 5-String Banjo with appearances from stars such as Dolly Parton. The album won the Grammy Award for Best Bluegrass Album in 2010. Nitty Gritty Dirt Band member John McEuen produced the album. Martin made his first appearance on The Grand Ole Opry on May 30, 2009. In the American Idol season eight finals, he performed alongside Michael Sarver and Megan Joy in the song "Pretty Flowers".

Steep Canyon Rangers 
 In June 2009, Martin played banjo along with the Steep Canyon Rangers on A Prairie Home Companion and began a two-month U.S. tour with the Rangers in September, including appearances at the Hardly Strictly Bluegrass festival, Carnegie Hall and Benaroya Hall in Seattle. In November, they went on to play at the Royal Festival Hall in London with support from Mary Black. In 2010, Steve Martin and the Steep Canyon Rangers appeared at the New Orleans Jazzfest, Merlefest Bluegrass Festival in Wilkesboro, North Carolina, at Bonnaroo Music Festival, at the ROMP Bluegrass Festival in Owensboro, Kentucky, at the Red Butte Garden Concert series, and on the BBC's Later... with Jools Holland. Martin performed "Jubilation Day" with the Steep Canyon Rangers on The Colbert Report on March 21, 2011, on Conan on May 3, 2011, and on BBC's The One Show on July 6, 2011. Martin performed a song he wrote called "Me and Paul Revere" in addition to two other songs on the lawn of the Capitol Building in Washington, DC, at the "Capitol Fourth Celebration" on July 4, 2011. While on tour, Martin and the Steep Canyon Rangers occasionally performed Martin's 1978 novelty hit song "King Tut" live in a bluegrass arrangement. One of these performances was released on the 2011 album Rare Bird Alert. In 2011, Martin also narrated and appeared in the PBS documentary "Give Me The Banjo" chronicling the history of the banjo in America.

Love Has Come for You, a collaboration album with Edie Brickell, was released in April 2013. The two made musical guest appearances on talk shows, such as The View and Late Show with David Letterman, to promote the album.
The title track won the Grammy Award for Best American Roots Song.
Starting in May 2013, he began a tour with the Steep Canyon Rangers and Edie Brickell throughout the United States. In 2015, Brickell and Martin released So Familiar as the second installment of their partnership. In 2017, Martin and Brickell appeared in the multi-award-winning documentary film The American Epic Sessions directed by Bernard MacMahon. Recording live direct-to-disc on the first electrical sound recording system from the 1920s, they performed a version of "The Coo Coo Bird" a traditional song that Martin learned from the 1960s folk music group The Holy Modal Rounders. The song was featured on the film soundtrack, Music from The American Epic Sessions released on June 9, 2017.

In 2010, Martin created the Steve Martin Prize for Excellence in Banjo and Bluegrass, an award established to reward artistry and bring greater visibility to bluegrass performers. The prize includes a US$50,000 cash award, a bronze sculpture created by the artist Eric Fischl, and a chance to perform with Martin on Late Show with David Letterman. Recipients include Noam Pikelny of the Punch Brothers band (2010), Sammy Shelor of Lonesome River Band (2011), Mark Johnson (2012), Jens Kruger (2013), Eddie Adcock (2014), Danny Barnes (2015), Rhiannon Giddens (2016), Scott Vestal (2017), Kristin Scott Benson (2018), and Victor Furtado (2019).

Personal life
In the late 1970s and early 1980s, Martin was in a relationship with Bernadette Peters, with whom he co-starred in The Jerk and Pennies from Heaven. He also dated Mary Tyler Moore and Karen Carpenter. On November 20, 1986, Martin married actress Victoria Tennant, with whom he co-starred in All of Me and L.A. Story. They divorced in 1994.

Martin went on a USO Tour to Saudi Arabia during Operation Desert Storm from October 14 to 21, 1990. Martin met with military service men and women all over the region signing thousands of autographs and posing for pictures. "Everybody coming out here, giving up part of their lives for this effort. I had some time off, and I felt kind of bad just sitting there," Martin said, "so I came."

On July 28, 2007, Martin married writer and former New Yorker staff member Anne Stringfield. Bob Kerrey presided over the ceremony at Martin's Los Angeles home. Lorne Michaels served as best man. The nuptials came as a surprise to several guests, who had been told they were coming for a party. In December 2012, Martin became a father at age 67 when Stringfield gave birth to their daughter.

Martin has been an avid art collector since 1968, when he bought a print by Ed Ruscha. In 2001, the Bellagio Gallery of Fine Art presented a five-month exhibit of twenty-eight items from Martin's collection, including works by Roy Lichtenstein, Pablo Picasso, David Hockney, and Edward Hopper. In 2006, he sold Hopper's Hotel Window (1955) at Sotheby's for $26.8 million. In 2015, working with two other curators, he organized a show, "The Idea of North: The Paintings of Lawren Harris", to introduce Americans to Canadian painter and Group of Seven co-founder Lawren Harris.

In July 2004, Martin purchased what he believed to be Landschaft mit Pferden (Landscape with Horses), a 1915 work by Heinrich Campendonk, from a Paris gallery for approximately €700,000. Fifteen months later, the painting was sold at Christie's auction to a Swiss businesswoman for €500,000. Police believe the fake Campendonk originated from a collection devised by a German forgery ring led by Wolfgang Beltracchi, pieces from which had been sold to French galleries. Martin only discovered the fact that the painting had been fake many years after it had been sold at the auction. Concerning the experience, Martin said that the Beltracchis "were quite clever in that they gave it a long provenance and they faked labels, and it came out of a collection that mingled legitimate pictures with faked pictures."

Martin served on the Los Angeles County Museum of Art board of trustees from 1984 to 2004. Martin assisted in launching the National Endowment for Indigenous Visual Arts (NEIVA), a fund to support Australian Indigenous artists in 2021. Martin has supported Indigenous Australian painting previously. He organized an exhibition in 2019 with Gagosian Gallery titled "Desert Painters of Australia", which featured art by George Tjungurrayi and Emily Kame Kngwarreye.

Martin suffers from tinnitus; the condition was first attributed to filming a pistol-shooting scene for Three Amigos in 1986, but Martin later clarified that the tinnitus was actually from years of listening to loud music and performing in front of noisy crowds.

Influences
Martin has stated that his comedy influences include Charlie Chaplin, Laurel and Hardy, Jack Benny, Jerry Lewis and Woody Allen.

Martin stated, on The Late Show with Stephen Colbert, that Jerry Seinfeld is one of his "retro heroes", "a guy who came up behind me and is better than I am. I think he's fantastic, I love to listen to him, he almost puts me at peace. I love to listen to him talk".

Martin's offbeat, ironic, and deconstructive style of humor has influenced many comedians during his career. This includes Tina Fey, Steve Carell, Conan O'Brien, Jon Stewart, Stephen Colbert, Robert Smigel, Bo Burnham, and Jordan Peele. Singer and composer Mike Patton cited Steve Martin as an early influence and said that he identified with Martin.

Filmography

Awards and nominations

Discography

Albums

Singles

Music videos

Stand-up specials
Steve Martin and Martin Short: An Evening You Will Forget for the Rest of Your Life, 2018

Other video releases
 Steve Martin-Live! (1986, VHS; includes short film "The Absent-Minded Waiter and footage from a 1979 concert)
 Saturday Night Live: The Best of Steve Martin (1998, DVD/VHS; sketch compilation)
 Steve Martin: The Television Stuff (2012, DVD; includes content of Steve Martin-Live! as well as his NBC specials and other television appearances)

Bibliography

Books and plays

Screenplays

Essays, reporting and other contributions
 
 Modern Library Humor and Wit Series (2000) (Introduction and series editor)

Citations

General and cited sources

External links

 
 
 
 
 : 2008 Morning Edition interview
 : 2003 Fresh Air interview
 
 Steve Martin's Orange County Orange County Register A review including some of the earlier gigs in his career.
 Image of Steve Martin playing the banjo with a trick arrow through his head, 1978. Los Angeles Times Photographic Archive (Local identifier uclalat_1429_b940_287780-7). UCLA Library Special Collections, Charles E. Young Research Library, University of California, Los Angeles.
 Interview with Steve Martin, Chevy Chase, Martin Short about The Three Amigos in 1986 from Texas Archive of the Moving Image

 
1945 births
Living people
20th-century American comedians
20th-century American male actors
20th-century American male musicians
21st-century American comedians
21st-century American male actors
21st-century American male musicians
Academy Honorary Award recipients
AFI Life Achievement Award recipients
American art collectors
American banjoists
American comedy musicians
American dramatists and playwrights
American film producers
American male comedians
American male dramatists and playwrights
American male film actors
American male non-fiction writers
American male screenwriters
American male television actors
American male voice actors
American memoirists
American people of English descent
American people of French descent
American people of German descent
American people of Scotch-Irish descent
American people of Scottish descent
American people of Welsh descent
American sketch comedians
American stand-up comedians
Audiobook narrators
California State University, Long Beach alumni
Comedians from California
Comedians from Texas
Fellows of the American Academy of Arts and Sciences
Film producers from California
Film producers from Texas
Grammy Award winners
Kennedy Center honorees
Male actors from California
Male actors from Inglewood, California
Male actors from Texas
Male actors from Waco, Texas
Mark Twain Prize recipients
Musicians from Inglewood, California
People from Garden Grove, California
People from Inglewood, California
People from Waco, Texas
Primetime Emmy Award winners
Rounder Records artists
Screenwriters from California
Screenwriters from Texas
Television producers from California
Television producers from Texas
The New Yorker people
University of California, Los Angeles alumni
United Service Organizations entertainers
Warner Records artists
Writers Guild of America Award winners